Get the Money is the third and final studio album by American rock band Taylor Hawkins and the Coattail Riders. It was released on November 8, 2019. It features 10 songs, including "I Really Blew It" and "Middle Child", for which music videos were recorded.

The album features guest contributions from Dave Grohl, Duff McKagan, Mark King, Joe Walsh, Roger Taylor, Nancy Wilson, Jon Davison, Perry Farrell, Chrissie Hynde, LeAnn Rimes, and Pat Smear. It was the last release by the band prior to the death of vocalist and drummer Taylor Hawkins on March 25, 2022.

Track listing

References

Taylor Hawkins and the Coattail Riders albums
2019 albums